Porte-Joie is a former commune in the Eure department in Normandy in northern France. On 1 January 2018, it was merged into the new commune of Porte-de-Seine.

Population

See also
Communes of the Eure department

References

Former communes of Eure